Kilungaatha Changalakal is a 1981 Indian Malayalam film, directed and produced by C. N. Venkita Swamy. The film stars Prem Nazir, Sumalatha, Jose Prakash and Ushakumari in the lead roles. The film has musical score by A. T. Ummer.

Cast
Prem Nazir as Mohan
Sumalatha as Latha
Jose Prakash as Rajaram
Ushakumari as Rekha
Alummoodan as Kochunni
Kunjan as Pappan
PK Abraham as Police inspector 
Sunkara Lakshmi as Julie
 Murali Mohan as Murali
 V.G.S Dev
 Rajashekaran
 Jaggi
 Chirayinkeezhu Ramakrishnan Nair
 Saam
 Lakshmi
 Meena
 Surekha
 Halam
 Mamatha

Soundtrack
The music was composed by A. T. Ummer and the lyrics were written by Chirayinkeezhu Ramakrishnan Nair.

References

External links
 

1981 films
1980s Malayalam-language films